Edward Cardillo is an American politician. He serves as a Democratic member for the 42nd district of the Rhode Island House of Representatives.

Cardillo attended at Cranston High School West, where he graduated in 1973. He worked as a mechanic. In 2021, Cardillo was elected for the 42nd district of the Rhode Island House of Representatives. He succeeded Stephen Ucci. Cardillo assumed office on January 5, 2021.

References 

Living people
Place of birth missing (living people)
Year of birth missing (living people)
Democratic Party members of the Rhode Island House of Representatives
21st-century American politicians
Mechanics (people)